Selectable Output Control (SOC) is a content protection Digital Rights Management (DRM) technology that is incorporated into approved devices that enables the Multichannel Video Programming Distributor (MVPD, your cable company) to disable non-secure audio-video output by encoding the video with a specific signal. In practice, SOC aims to limit the output of high definition video over non-secure analog outputs such as component video connections. When enabled, SOC will only output high definition content over a High-Definition Multimedia Interface (HDMI) to devices that are High-bandwidth Digital Content Protection (HDCP) approved. This means that when SOC is enabled for a program, older televisions that do not have an HDMI port or are not HDCP compliant will not be able to view content. The U.S. Federal Communications Commission (FCC) has, until recently, had a ban on the use of SOC.

On May 7, 2010 the FCC granted a limited waiver of Section 76.1903 to allow the use of SOC. This waiver was filed by the Motion Picture Association of America (MPAA) to allow the use of SOC to broadcast first run movies shortly after theatrical release, but prior to home video release. The MPAA argued that member companies (the studios) would not agree to releasing these movies to the On-Demand market without the ability to enforce copy protection, which analog outputs such as component video connections lack. The concern being that unprotected analog output is open to piracy. The FCC agreed that it would be in the public interest to allow the use of SOC since it would allow more Americans who may have difficulty getting to the movies the opportunity to enjoy first run movies in the home. The FCC cites an example using homebound parents with young children that may have a hard time getting to the movies due to not being able to find a babysitter. The American Association of People with Disabilities is also in favor of the MPAA's plan to offer high-definition first run movies before home video release because it would increase the entertainment options that disabled Americans have in the home.

The waiver granted by the FCC is limited in that it does not enable all of the actions requested by the MPAA in its waiver application, citing the request as being broad and undefined. According to the FCC waiver on SOC, the following limitations would be placed on the granted waiver.

There would be an SOC Activation Window Limitation. SOC can only be used for 90 days from the first day it is implemented, or until the movie is available on any pre-recorded media (DVD, Blu-ray Disc), whichever comes first. That way, according to the FCC, owners of legacy HDTVs (those without HDMI connections or HDCP certification) will not lose access to any content that they previously had access to. The FCC's 90-day limitation window is an effort to limit the potential of the MPAA to circumvent the rule by not releasing content on pre-recorded media. For example, as the world moves toward video-on-demand, physical media could become obsolete. In such a case, a movie may never be released on "pre-recorded" media. After 90 days, SOC would be banned from use.

The Waiver will be reviewed in 2 years. The FCC will review the waiver in two years time and assess whether the use of SOC has had adverse effects on public interest. However, the FCC leaves it up to companies that use SOC to file a report. This report should contain a summary of all consumer complaints in regard to SOC, the average price charged for first run programming with SOC activated, the average price charged for video-on-demand without SOC activated, detailed box office results prior to and after offering the program on-demand with SOC activated, and whether SOC has been effective in combating piracy during its use. This is certainly not a requirement and is vague in details. However, should SOC be ineffective at combating piracy there may be little incentive in using it. In fact, it may be possible that the MPAA member studios could decide against the continued practice of releasing first run movies to the video-on-demand market.

The approved output devices are HDMI, all digital outputs that CableLabs has approved for unidirectional digital cable products, or any MVPD-approved protected output for Internet Protocol television (IPTV) or Satellite Broadcasters. The intent here is to discourage the development of proprietary output connections by either the MPAA or the MVPD that could hamper competition from third party devices by using standard and/or accepted means of copy protected output.

Closed Captioning and Video Description should be provided as this is already a requirement that video-on-demand services must be offered with closed captions.

The FCC included a consumer protection limit with the promise to cancel the waiver should MVPD not implement SOC in a manner that is in accordance with the waiver requirements.

The waiver is not just limited to the MPAA or the MVPDs. According to the waiver "any similarly situated provider of firstrun theatrical content (“similarly situated provider”) and its MVPD partners may take advantage of the instant waiver by filing an Election to Participate (“Election’) in this proceeding."

See also
Copy Control Information

References

External links
 http://hraunfoss.fcc.gov/edocs_public/attachmatch/DA-10-795A1.pdf

Digital rights management